Barbara Slate (born May 9, 1947) is an American artist, cartoonist, graphic novelist, comic book creator, and writer. She is one of the few female artists who has created, written, and drawn comics for both DC and Marvel Comics. Her textbook, You Can Do a Graphic Novel, was first published in 2010 by Alpha Books (Penguin/Putnam). In 1986 Barbara created Angel Love for DC Comics, an adult-themed series for teenagers. In an exhibition review, The New York Times described her art as "emphatically of our time with its narrative of passion, gun violence, and female assertiveness."

Career

Early work
In 1974, Slate's feminist cartoon character, Ms. Liz, appeared on millions of greeting cards, in a regular comic strip in Cosmopolitan magazine, and as the star in a series of animated segments on NBC's Today show in 1982. Many magazines and newspapers published extensive articles about Barbara Slate and Ms. Liz. Slate was interviewed about Ms. Liz for a seven-page feature in Cartoonist Profiles in 1983.

Comics

Comic Book Resources began Barbara Slate Week May 13, 2013 with a column about Angel Love. For Marvel Comics she created, wrote, and drew Sweet XVI, wrote 65 Barbie and Barbie Fashion comics and put her own spin on the Disney films Beauty and the Beast and Pocahontas. She also wrote and did the layout for the comic New Kids on the Block for Harvey Comics and Scooby Doo for DC Comics. Barbara wrote over one hundred Betty and Veronica stories for Archie Comics throughout the 1990s and 2000s.

Comic Strips
1980s:  Ms. Liz was featured in Cosmopolitan, Working Woman, SELF, and New Woman

1989-90: Yuppies From Hell (Marvel Comics) was excerpted in Cosmopolitan

1993-94: Makin' Ends Meet appeared in First for Women magazine; 1995: Violet appeared in International magazine
  

1998: Spinville appeared in React Magazine

Columns
2008-2010:  You Can Do A Graphic Novel] in Archie Digests, The Independent Newspaper, The Columbia Newspaper

2009:  "I Got Married and Other Mistakes" in The Columbia Newspaper

Graphic Novels

In 2012, Other Press published Getting Married and Other Mistakes. Jo is a successful wedding photographer who had followed her mother's advice to snag a husband.  After nine years of an unblissful marriage she is dumped for another woman and desperately needs to get on with her life.  She realizes that her Mr. Right was actually Mr. Wrong and that she was living her life according to everyone's rules but her own.  The graphic novel delves into Jo's struggle with female guilt and her quest for self-awareness.

Getting Married and Other Mistakes was featured May 17, 2013 as the final segment of Barbara Slate Week by Comic Book Resources.

Teaching
Barbara Slate travels nationwide as a keynote speaker, teacher, moderator and panelist. She teaches kids, teens, and adults how to do graphic novels at schools, libraries, and art centers nationwide, and is an instructor at The Cooper Union in New York City.

In 2010, Pearson (Penuin/Alpha) published Slate's textbook, You Can Do a Graphic Novel. Tom DeFalco, editor-in-chief of Marvel Comics from 1987-1995, wrote the foreword for YCDAGN. YCDAGN was endorsed by Stan Lee, "...if anyone can bring out the writer and artist hidden within society's somnambulant psyche it's the titanically talented Barbara Slate. So please don't read this book. I have a family to support!"

A Teacher's Guide is used with this book at all levels of classroom education.

Books
In the late 1990s, Slate wrote four Barbie Golden books, all published by Western Publishing Company. In '92 Slate wroteThe Big Splash, in '93 Very Busy Barbie, in '94 Hi, My Name is Barbie, and '95 was Soccer Coach.  In 2002, she wrote and drew The Shelby Care and Training Guide, published by Scholastic. She did the layout and illustrated "Truly Mars & Venus" by John Gray in 2003, published by Harper-Collins in many languages.

She is profiled in the seminal work "A Century of Women Cartoonists".

References

External links
 http://barbaraslate.com/

American female comics artists
1947 births
Living people
Romance comics artists